Por Kai Shan, is a mountain on Lantau Island, Hong Kong, with a height of  above sea level.

Flora 
Por Kai Shan and neighbouring Pok To Yan were designated together a "Site of Special Scientific Interest" in 1994. According to the local government, this site has "over 200 species of native plants." and "a number of rare and protected indigenous plants".

Geography 
To the northwest is Tung Chung, while to the south is Sunset Peak.

See also 
 List of mountains, peaks and hills in Hong Kong

References